The critical philosophy movement, attributed to Immanuel Kant (1724–1804), sees the primary task of philosophy as criticism rather than justification of knowledge. Criticism, for Kant, meant judging as to the possibilities of knowledge before advancing to knowledge itself (from the Greek kritike (techne), or "art of judgment"). The basic task of philosophers, according to this view, is not to establish and demonstrate theories about reality, but rather to subject all theories—including those about philosophy itself—to critical review, and measure their validity by how well they withstand criticism.

"Critical philosophy" is also used as another name for Kant's philosophy itself. Kant said that philosophy's proper inquiry is not about what is out there in reality, but rather about the character and foundations of experience itself. We must first judge how human reason works, and within what limits, so that we can afterwards correctly apply it to sense experience and determine whether it can be applied at all to metaphysical objects.

The principal three sources on which the critical philosophy is based are the three critiques, namely Critique of Pure Reason, Critique of Practical Reason and Critique of Judgement, published between 1781 and 1790 and mostly concerned, respectively, with metaphysics, ethics and aesthetics.

See also 
Critical idealism
Critical thinking
Charles Bernard Renouvier
Léon Brunschvicg

References
 Stanford Encyclopedia of Philosophy: Immanuel Kant

Kantianism
Immanuel Kant